This is a list of all devices coming natively with Microsoft's Windows 10 Mobile operating system. The list also includes devices running two additional flavours of Windows 10 for mobile devices, Windows 10 Mobile Enterprise and Windows 10 IoT Mobile Enterprise. All devices below come with SD card support.

Processors supported are Qualcomm's Snapdragon 210, 212, 410, 617, 800, 801, 808, 810 and 820 as well as Rockchip's RK3288.

Devices

Phones

Phablets

Tablets

Rugged devices

See also
 Windows 10 Mobile version history
 Windows 10 Mobile
 List of Windows Phone 8 devices
 List of Windows Phone 8.1 devices

Notes

References

 
Mobile devices
Windows 10 Mobile devices
Windows 10 Mobile devices
Windows 10